Syndicate is a  song by Denver-based rock band the Fray. It is the opening track and the third single from their eponymous second studio album. It was released on January 12, 2010, for radio airplay, while the music video was released on February 9, 2010. Despite a generally positive critical reception, the song is the lowest charting single from the album.

Critical reception
AbsolutePunk stated the song had "a winning piano line" and commented upon its musical style, saying it "pushed out into a grander, denser sound than found before." Sputnikmusic called it an "uplifting opener."

Music video
The music video, directed by Mark Pellington, premiered on February 9, 2010, on Yahoo! Music. The video is abstract in concept. It makes use of the multiple exposure technique: most scenes feature the band members' faces overlapping, rather than showing each of them individually. However, a few scenes do show the band members performing separately. Various miscellaneous objects and people are interspersed in the sequences, while the entire video is set against a glittering blood red and yellow background. This is the second time Pellington is working with the band; he had earlier directed a video for "How to Save a Life" in 2007.

The music video uses the "Radio Remix Version" of the song which adds extra vocals towards the end of the song, although the length of the remix is the same as that of the album version.

Chart performance
"Syndicate" debuted at #25 on the Hot Adult Top 40 Tracks chart in the week ending January 17, 2010. After a slow climb, it peaked at #16 on the chart 11 weeks later, in the week ending April 11, 2010.
The song also charted at #40 on the Pop Songs chart (their lowest position on the chart till date); it entered the chart on the week ending March 13, 2010 and dropped out the next week. It became the second single in the band's career to miss the Billboard Hot 100 chart (the other being "All at Once").

Chart positions

References

2008 songs
2010 singles
The Fray songs
Epic Records singles
Rock ballads
Songs written by Joe King (guitarist)
Songs written by Isaac Slade
Music videos directed by Mark Pellington